Huda TV is a Satellite TV and internet television channel free-to-air, English language, Islamic-focused, offers the message of Islam in English. It was launched in 2005.

Content & Programs
 Gems of the Heart.
 Ask Huda.
 Gardens of the Pious.
 Correct your Recitation
 Hajj Impressions 
 Quran Circle 
 How He Treated Them 
 Inspirations

Frequency
The previous frequencies were as follows:

Galaxy 19 @ 97W, Frequency 12184, Transponder 28, Symbol Rate 22000, FEC 3/4, Polarisation: Horizontal 

Nilesat, Frequency 11747, Polarization: Vertical, Symbol Rate 27500, FEC 3/4 

The current frequency is:

Intelsat 20, Frequency 4149.5, Symbol Rate 14400, 3/4 Horizontal.

Notable people
 Hamad Al-Ghammas, chairman of the board of directors.
Jamil Rashid, Director of Huda TV.

Speakers
 Yusuf Estes
 Zakir Naik
 Abu Usamah at-Thahabi
 Bilal Philips

See also 
 Islamic television networks

References

External links 
 Official website

 Al Huda TV Youtube Shorts

Islamic television networks
English-language television stations
Television channels and stations established in 2005
Saudi Arabian companies established in 2005